The 2003 Tashkent Open was a women's tennis tournament played on hard courts at the Tashkent Tennis Center in Tashkent, Uzbekistan that was part of the Tier IV category of the 2003 WTA Tour. It was the fifth edition of the tournament and was held from 6 October through 12 October 2003. Fourth-seeded Virginia Ruano Pascual won the singles title and earned $22,000 first-prize money.

Finals

Singles

 Virginia Ruano Pascual defeated  Saori Obata, 6–2, 7–6(7–2)
 It was Ruano Pascual's first singles title of her the year and the third and last of her career.

Doubles

 Yulia Beygelzimer /  Tatiana Poutchek defeated  Li Ting /  Tatiana Poutchek, 6–3, 7–6(7–0)

References

External links
 Official website
 ITF tournament edition details
 Tournament draws

Tashkent Open
Tashkent Open
Tashkent Open
Tashkent Open